Enigmazomus is a genus of hubbardiid short-tailed whipscorpions, first described by Mark Harvey in 2006.

Species 
, the World Schizomida Catalog accepts the following two species:

 Enigmazomus benoiti (Lawrence, 1969) – Somalia
 Enigmazomus eruptoclausus Harvey, 2006 – Oman

References 

Schizomida genera